St John of Jerusalem's Church, Winkburn is a Grade I listed parish church in the Church of England in Winkburn.

History

The church was built in the 12th century. The tower was rebuilt in the 17th century, and the church was re-roofed in 1853.

From 1199 to 1832 there was a cell of the Knights Hospitaller based here.

References

Church of England church buildings in Nottinghamshire
Grade I listed churches in Nottinghamshire
Church buildings of the Knights Hospitaller